The Nogat is a river in northern Poland.

Nogat may also refer to the following villages in Poland:
 Nogat, Kuyavian-Pomeranian Voivodeship
 Nogat, Warmian-Masurian Voivodeship

See also
NOGAT Pipeline System